The Hero of the Soviet Union was the highest distinction of the Soviet Union. It was awarded 12,775 times. Due to the large size of the list, it has been broken up into multiple pages.

Military Personnel

Partisans

Test pilots

Soviet Civilians

National Leaders

References

Lists of Heroes of the Soviet Union